Bartels's spiny rat (Maxomys bartelsii) is a species of rodent in the family Muridae.
It is found only in Indonesia. This species is indigenous to the volcano forests of west and central Java, the main island of Indonesia. The species is able to tolerate moderate disturbance and can be found at the edge of the forests as well.

References

Maxomys
Mammals described in 1910
Taxa named by Fredericus Anna Jentink
Taxonomy articles created by Polbot
Endemic fauna of Indonesia
Rodents of Indonesia